Antonio Puglicochi was an Italian painter of the Baroque period, active mainly in his native city of Florence. He was a pupil successively of Pietro Dandini and Ciro Ferri.

References

17th-century Italian painters
Italian male painters
Painters from Florence
Italian Baroque painters
Year of death unknown
Year of birth unknown